Birgit Kiesow (born 17 January 1957) is a German rower. She competed in the women's eight event at the 1976 Summer Olympics.

References

1957 births
Living people
German female rowers
Olympic rowers of West Germany
Rowers at the 1976 Summer Olympics
Sportspeople from Lübeck